Rebecca's Wedding Day is a 1914 American short comedy film starring Fatty Arbuckle.

Cast
 Phyllis Allen
 Roscoe 'Fatty' Arbuckle
 Minta Durfee
 Billy Gilbert (as Little Billy Gilbert)

See also
 List of American films of 1914
 Fatty Arbuckle filmography

References

External links

1914 films
1914 comedy films
1914 short films
American silent short films
American black-and-white films
Films directed by George Nichols
Silent American comedy films
American comedy short films
1910s American films